Ashley Merriman is a chef from Center Sandwich, New Hampshire.

She graduated from Hamilton College (class of 1998) and the Institute of Culinary Education (ICE).  When she was in New York City, most of the time she worked at Butter and when in Seattle, at Tilth.  When she appeared on season six of Top Chef, she was working as a chef in Seattle at Branzino. 

Ashley went east to work for Alex Guarnaschelli and in 2012 took over the kitchen at the Waverly Inn in the West Village.

Merriman is married to Gabrielle Hamilton. They bought into The Spotted Pig with Ken Friedman but negative backlash from the #MeToo Movement made them decide to pull out.  At the time, they were co-chefs at their restaurant Prune. 

In 2021, she was hired as the executive chef at the National Arts Club in Manhattan.

References

LGBT chefs
Chefs from New Hampshire
Hamilton College (New York) alumni
American women restaurateurs
American restaurateurs
Top Chef contestants
Year of birth missing (living people)
Living people